Graciela Beatriz Gelmini is a theoretical physicist who specializes in astroparticle physics. She is a professor at the University of California, Los Angeles (UCLA), and became a fellow of the American Physical Society in 2004.

Early life and career 
Gelmini received her Ph.D. from the National University of La Plata in 1981. Her doctoral advisors were Roberto Peccei and Carlos A. Garcia Canal. 

Upon graduation, Gelmini worked at the Ludwig Maximilian University of Munich in Germany for a few years before moving to the International Centre for Theoretical Physics in Italy at around 1982. During this time, she was based at CERN in Switzerland. Gelmini was also affiliated with the Lyman Laboratory of Physics at Harvard University and the Enrico Fermi Institute at the University of Chicago between 1986 and 1988.

In November 1989, Gelmini joined UCLA as a faculty member and has been there ever since.

Scientific contributions 
In November 2007, Gelmini was part of a team that analyzed data from the Pierre Auger Observatory in Argentina and discovered high-energy particles that made it to Earth from nearby black holes.

Publications

References 

Year of birth missing (living people)
National University of La Plata alumni
University of California, Los Angeles faculty
Fellows of the American Physical Society
Theoretical physicists
Particle physicists
Living people